Cryptomonadaceae is a family of Cryptophyta in the order Cryptomonadales.

References

External links 
 

Cryptomonads
Eukaryote families